Clarks may refer to:

Places
Clarks, Indiana, U.S.
Clarks, Louisiana, U.S.
Clarks, Nebraska, U.S.

Other uses
C. & J. Clark, better known as Clarks, a British shoe store and manufacturer
The Clarks, a rock band from Pittsburgh, Pennsylvania
 The Clarks (album), by The Clarks
 Clark's Super Gas, now Clark Brands, former US gasoline retailer

See also
Clark (disambiguation)
Clark's rule
Clarks Hill, Indiana
Clarks Hill, South Carolina
Clarks Green, Pennsylvania
Clarks Grove, Minnesota
Clark's Island, Massachusetts
Clarks Summit, Pennsylvania
Clarks Mills, Wisconsin, an unincorporated community
Clarks Point, Wisconsin, an unincorporated community
Clarks Summit, Pennsylvania
Clarks Summit University, located in Clarks Summit, Pennsylvania
 Clarksburg (disambiguation)
 Clarkson (disambiguation)
 Clarkston (disambiguation)
Clarksville (disambiguation)